Fazal or Fazl is a given name meaning grace. Notable people with the name include:

Abul Fazal Muhammad Ahsanuddin Chowdhury or A. F. M. Ahsanuddin Chowdhury, the ninth President of the People's Republic of Bangladesh
Abul Fazal (writer) (1903–1983), Bangladeshi author and novelist
Abu'l-Fazl ibn Mubarak (1551–1602), the vizier of the great Mughal emperor Akbar
Ali Fazal (born 1986), Indian actor in movies and on stage
Anwar Fazal (born 1941), Malaysian grassroots environmental activist
Azra Fazal Peechoho or Azra Peechoho (born 1953), politician and physician in Sindh, Pakistan
Faiz Fazal, full name Faiz Yakub Fazal, (born 1985), Indian cricketer
Fazal Akbar (born 1903), sixth Chief Justice of Pakistan
Fazal Ali (1886–1959), governor of Assam and Orissa, and a judge
Fazal Ali Qureshi, Islamic scholar and the leading Naqshbandi shaikh of colonial India in the early twentieth century
Fazal Dad Khan (1929–1999), Pakistani politician born in Dagai
Fazal Dad Khan Dagai (1929–1999), activist of the Pakistan freedom movement
Fazal Din (1921–1945), Punjabi Muslim recipient of the Victoria Cross
Fazal Haq Khaliqyar (1934–2004), Afghan politician, briefly Chairman of the Council of Ministers
Fazal Haq Mujahid (born 1954), Mujahideen commander during the Soviet war in Afghanistan
Fazal Hayat (1974–2018), leader of a banned Pakistani militant group
Fazal Ilahi Chaudhry (1904–1982), the fifth President of Pakistan
Fazal Inayat-Khan (1942–1990), also known as Frank Kevlin, son of Hidayat Inayat Khan, grandson of Hazrat Inayat Khan
Fazal Khan, Pakistani lawyer and Pashtun human rights activist
Fazal Mahmood (1927–2005), Pakistani cricketer
Fazal Mohammad, citizen of Afghanistan and formerly a Taliban militia commander
Fazal Nawaz Jung (1894–1964), Hyderabadi politician and financier
Fazal Niyazai, Afghan cricketer
Fazl ur Rahman (disambiguation), several people
Fazal Shah, member of National Assembly from Khairpur District, Sindh, Pakistan
Fazal Shah Sayyad (1827–1890), Punjabi poet known for his qissas (long poems) on tragic romances
Fazal Sheikh (born 1965), American photographer
Fazal-e-Haq or Fazle Haq, high-ranking general in the Pakistan Army
Mohammed Fazal (born 1922), Governor of Maharashtra 2002–2004
Fazal Khan Changawi (1868–1938), Punjabi writer of numerous books on Islam
Said Fazal Akbar, the first Governor of Kunar province in Afghanistan after the fall of the Taliban in 2001
Sohail Fazal (born 1967), Pakistani cricketer who played two ODIs in 1989
Zahid Fazal (born 1973), Pakistani cricketer

See also
Fazal Ali Commission
Fazal Katchh
Fazal Mosque
Fazal-e-amal
Tando Fazal
Faisal (disambiguation)
Fazuul